Odradek Records is a cooperative, non-profit record label that releases recordings of classical music.

History 
Odradek Records, based in the United States, was founded by John Anderson in 2012 as an artist-controlled label for performers wishing to release recordings with more freedom than with other labels. Designed according to the model of peer-reviewed scientific journals, Odradek Records allows submissions from any performer, and these submissions are evaluated by other professionals. The founder, John Anderson, described this process: "Artists are chosen anonymously based solely on a demo recording by a committee of myself and four others, who rotate year to year." In 2014, the label launched the open-access online blind team judging platform Anonymuze.com, and since then all applications to the label have been processed through this platform. In 2015, the label opened a jazz imprint, followed by a world imprint in 2018. 

Odradek owns and operates ODRATEK BV, based in the Netherlands, a holding company for several digital startups and the European branch for the label's investments and management structure. ODRATEK is the majority stakeholder in the creative marketing company vist.co kulturmanagement GmbH (The Visual Storytelling Company) based in Hamburg, Germany. ODRATEK is dedicated to promoting and sustaining cultural heritage with apps and software, which include the biography platform B.io and Neumz, the world's first complete recording of all Gregorian chants presented alongside scores, texts, and translations.

Since 2017, Odradek Records also organizes concerts for its music association in its Italian studio "The Spheres"  to showcase its artists.

Odradek Records takes its name from a mythical creature in Franz Kafka's story "The Cares of a Family Man."

Artists and composers
Odradek Records focuses on classical, jazz, and world music. 

Piano
 Michele Campanella
 Muriel Chemin
 Domenico Codispoti
 Mei Yi Foo
 Vittorio Forte
 François-Frédéric Guy
 Alexander Lonquich
 Pina Napolitano
 Javier Negrín
 Artur Pizarro
 Josu de Solaun Soto
 Rinaldo Zhok

Violin
 Johannes Fleischmann
 Franco Mezzena
 Franziska Pietsch
 Yury Revich

Viola
 Jesus Rodolfo
 Krzysztof Komendarek-Tymendorf

Cello
 Adolfo Gutiérrez Arenas
 Yuko Miyagawa

Double Bass
 Gary Peacock

Soprano
 Chen Reiss
 Maija Kovaļevska

Baritone
 Paul Armin Edelmann
 Will Liverman

Bass-Baritone
 Egils Siliņš

Choir
 State Choir Latvija

Ensembles
 Trio Agora
 Trio Delta
 Drumming Grupo de Percussão
 Carion Wind Quintet
 Ensemble Linea
 Lutosławski Quartet
 Mediva

Conductors
 Atvars Lakstīgala 
 Thomas Rösner
 Andris Poga

Orchestras
 Bamberg Symphony
 Beethoven Philharmonie
 Colibrì Ensemble
 Gulbenkian Orchestra
 Latvian National Symphony Orchestra
 Liepāja Symphony Orchestra
 Lithuanian Chamber Orchestra
 Lithuanian National Symphony Orchestra
 Pärnu City Orchestra
 Real Filarmónica de Galicia
 Seattle Symphony

Composers
 Lera Auerbach
 Arno Babajanian
 Rodolphe Bruneau-Boulmier
 Elliott Carter
 Unsuk Chin
 Hugh Collins Rice
 Hugues Dufourt
 Aurélien Dumont
 Dai Fujikura
 Sofia Gubaidulina
 Toshio Hosokawa
 Charles Ives
 Giya Kancheli
 Leon Kirchner
 Thomas Kotcheff
 György Kurtág
 Ramon Lazkano
 Jesús García Leoz
 György Ligeti
 Silvan Loher
 Tigran Mansurian
 Szilárd Mezei
 Akira Miyoshi
 Eric Moe
 Marc Monnet
 Jeffrey Mumford
 Akira Nishimura
 Arnold Schoenberg
 Alfred Schnittke
 Yoichi Sugiyama
 Yūji Takahashi
 Luís Tinoco
 Mikel Urquiza
 Pēteris Vasks
 Anton Webern
 Joji Yuasa

Economic model
As a non-profit record label, Odradek Records co-invests 50% of project costs and keeps only enough money from sales to cover expenses, passing on all profits to the performers. Odradek Records provides access to their recording studio for all recordings.

See also
 List of record labels

References

External links
 Odradek Records web site
 Web site of Odradek Records founder John Anderson
 Interview with Odradek Records founder John Anderson on Kansas Public Radio

2012 establishments in the United States
American record labels
Classical music record labels
Cooperatives in the United States
Music organizations based in the United States
Record labels established in 2012